Scope mounts are used to attach telescopic sights or other types of sights to firearms. The scope sight itself is usually made for only one of two main types of mounts, which can be classified as scopes for ring mounts (for example a 30 mm tube) or scopes for rail mounts (like for example the Zeiss rail). Words such as mounts and bases are used somewhat loosely, and can refer to several different parts which are either used together or in place of each other as ways to mount optical sights to firearms. When it comes to the interface of the firearm itself, the Picatinny rail is one of the most widespread standard for new firearms as of 2020. While most scopes are made for being mounted either with a ring mount or a rail mount, some sights have an integral mounting mechanism allowing them to be attached directly to the firearm, like for example an integrated Picatinny mount. In addition, there are many proprietary and brand-specific types of mounts that either can be used with Picatinny rails or as alternatives to Picatinny (see the section on Link between scope and firearm). Scope mounts may be offered by firearm and scope manufacturers, or on the aftermarket.

Scopes for rail mounts

Zeiss rail 
Among scopes for rail mounts, the 22.5 degree V-shaped Zeiss rail is the most prevalent standard. It was introduced in 1990, and after the patent expired in 2008, compatible scopes have been offered from manufacturers such as Blaser, Leica, Minox, Meopta, Nikon, Noblex (formerly Docter), Schmidt & Bender and Steiner. It has therefore, in some sense, become the de facto industry standard for scope mounting rails. The system has so far seen most use on the European high end market.

Swarovski SR rail 
The Swarovski SR rail (patented in 2002, introduced in 2005 The Swarovski SR rail is also used by Kahles, a Swarovski subsidiary.) has a flat rail with many "teeth" as recoil lugs, and is only offered on scopes from Swarovski and its subsidiary Kahles. It separates itself from the Zeiss rail in that it is not neither stepless nor self-centering.

S&B Convex rail 
A former competing standard was the halv-circle shaped Schmidt & Bender Convex rail (also introduced in 2005), but Schmidt & Bender after a few years changed to following the Zeiss rail standard. In contrast to the Zeiss and Swarovski systems, the S&B Convex rail had the possibility to add a cant to the scope when mounting (such that the reticle is not horizontal to the ground).

70 degree prism rail 
There is also an older European system with an upside-down V-shape (70 degrees), but this system has little widespread use today. The advantage of this system was that it at one time was offered by most European scope manufacturers, but the disadvantage was that the rail had to be drilled for a screw each time the eye relief was to be adjusted. All new standards for rail mounts have addressed this issue.

Scopes for ring mounts 

Ring mounts usually consist of a base attached to the firearm and rings (usually two) attached to the sight. The rings are usually made of steel or aluminum. Common diameters on ring mounts are 25.4 mm (1 inch), 26 mm, 30 mm and 34 mm. There are big differences in the strength and ability of sustained precision on different assemblies. With weak cartridges such as .22 LR applied in light-use scenarios, a pair of skinny aluminium rings may work well, while firearms with very powerful recoil often combined with a heavy sight may require steel rings or thicker aluminum rings with recoil lugs to be used.

Sizes 
Scopes for ring mounts are available in many different sizes. The most common ones are:

 1 inch (25.4 mm)
 30 mm
 34 mm

Some less common standards are:

  inch (19.05 mm)
  inch (22.2 mm)
 26 mm - Some older European scopes
 35 mm - Some IOR, Vortex and Leupold models
 36 mm - Some Zeiss and Hensoldt models
 40 mm - Some IOR models and Swarovski dS

Lapping 
In order for a ring assembly to grip evenly, it is important that the scope rings are circular and coaxial with the scope tube. On ring mounts that grip unevenly, the ring mount can be lapped to prevent uneven pressure when mounting. One scopes made for ring mounts, it is not uncommon to get ring marks when mounting the rings.

Ring inserts 
There are insert rings on the market which allows for mounting a scope inside a ring mount of a larger diameter. An example could be to mount a scope with a 1-inch (25.4 mm) tube in a 30 mm mount using a plastic insert.

There are also special ring mounts in the market with circularly shaped ring inserts made to provide stress free mounting without lapping, with Burris Signature Rings and Sako Optilock Rings as two well-known examples. Burris Signature was introduced in 1995. A patent was applied for in 1994, and was granted in 1995. Sako Optilock has been sold since some time in the early 2000s. The trade name Optilock was registered in USA on 31 December 1997, and is listed as having been marketed in USA since 31 December 2001. In 2000, Sako was sold to Beretta Holding. In 2002, Burris was also sold to Beretta Holding, and thus Burris and Sako got the same owners. Burris' original patent for the rings with the circular insertes was considered to have expired in 2014, and as of 2020 is listed as "definitely expired".

In 2015, XTR Signature Rings was launched as a further development of the Burris Signature series. The XTR variant differs in that it has two circular cavities per ring assembly versus one. A patent for the XTR Signature Rings was applied for in 2016, and was granted to Burris in 2019.

Mounts for compact sights 

Many reflex sights (e.g. red dot sights) and holographic sights have proprietary mounts.

 Aimpoint Acro rail: A dovetail rail for attaching a sight via a clamping mechanism, and with a 4 mm wide straight recoil lug groove. The dovetail is approximately 16.5 mm wide, and is radiused so as not to have any sharp edges. The mount is compact enough to be used on pistols, as well as rifles and shotguns. Launched in 2019 together with the sights Aimpoint Acro P-1 and C-1. Also used on Aimpoint Acro C-2 and P-2, as well as Steiner MPS.
 Aimpoint Micro standard: First introduced in 2007 on the small tube sight variants of Aimpoint, but today used by other manufacturers as well. Popular on rifles and shotguns, but not on handguns due to its size. The mounting standard uses four screws and one cross slot acting as a recoil lug. Used on red dot sights such as Aimpoint Micro, Vortex Crossfire, Sig Sauer Romeo 4 & 5, and some Holosun Paralow variants.
 Aimpoint CompM4 mount: Launched in 2007 with the Aimpoint CompM4 sight. The sight is attached to the mount via two M5 screws from the underside, and the mount has a transverse groove acting as a recoil lug. The Aimpoint Comp line was launched in 1993. The predecessor of the CompM4, CompM2, had a 30 mm ring mount and was introduced in the American military in 2000. Some manfacturers have copied the M4 mount system, but it has mainly been used by Aimpoint.
 C-More standard: A mounting standard introduced by C-More Sights. Uses two screws and two circular notches acting as recoil lugs. Used on red dot sights such as Delta Optical MiniDot, Kahles Helia, Vortex Razor and Sig Sauer Romeo3.
 Docter/Noblex standard: The mounting pattern which through the 2010s was used by the largest number of manufacturers, perhaps due to the wide range of aftermarket mounts available. The mounting standard uses two screws and four circular notches acting as recoil lugs. Used on red dot sights such as Docter/Noblex sights, Burris Fastfire, Vortex Viper, Leica Tempus, etc.
Shield standard: A proprietary standard used by Shield Sights. Similar in shape to the Noblex/Docter footprint, but with other dimensions. In addition to the Shield red dot sights, it is also used on the Leupold Delta Point Pro.
 Trijicon RMR/SRO-standard: Has two screw holes, and two shallow circular notches acting as recoil lugs. Mainly used on the Trijicon RMR and SRO red dot sights, as well as on some Holosun sights.
 Other: Some notable red dot sights which have unique footprints not compatible with any of the above are Sig Sauer Romeo 1, Holosun Paralow 403A, Holosun 509T and Swampfox Kraken MRDS. There also exists reflex sights for ring mounts (e.g. Aimpoint CompM2 with a 30 mm tube) or with an integrated Picatinny base.

Link between scope and firearm

Bases 
By bases, is usually meant an interconnecting part between the scope and the firearm. For example, a base may have a picatinny attachment on the underside, while the upper side may have either a ring (e.g. 30 mm) or rail mounting (e.g. Zeiss rail). On some assemblies, the upper and lower parts of the base are separate parts that must be screwed together and fastened to a specified torque. A base can thus sometimes constitute a complete scope mount assembly, but is most often used to refer to the lower part of a two-part scope mount assembly.

The firearm interface which sits on the firearm and to which the scope mount is attached is often called the base or rail.

Some types of bases are:

Standard mounts
 Picatinny rail: Standardized slot distances.
 Weaver rail: Varying width between the slots.

Proprietary and brand specific mounts
 Claw mount. Several types, for example Suhl Claw Mounts, Ziegler ZP mount, and others.
 Pivot mount. Several types, for example EAW, MAKlick, Steyr Luxus, and others.
 Aimpoint Micro, also used by other red dot manufacturers. (Not compatible with Aimpoint Comp or the Aimpoint ACRO mounting standards. See Red dot sight#Mounting types for more red dot mounting standards).
 Blaser saddle mount
 Contessa 12 mm "Euro rail" mount
 Browning X-Lock
 Double dovetail, which is rotated and tapped into place. Several types, for example the Leupold Dual Dovetail
 Mauser M03 Double Square Mount
 Picatinny-against-picatinny (Burris Eliminator)
 Pulsar type rail mount. Has some visual similarities with the Zeiss rail, but is incompatible due to a wider base and steeper angle.
 Redfield type with windage adjustable mount, also known Redfield Standard Junior. Similar concepts are made by other manufacturers, e.g. "Leupold standard", "Burris TU/SU". Also manufactured by Weaver.  Specifications can vary between manufacturers.
 Ruger integral type (used on Ruger No. 1, M77, Gunsite Scout, the Ranch series of the Mini-14 and Mini-30, Deerfield Carbine, Model 96 (.44 Magnum only) and PC Carbine.)
 Sako Optilock, either with rings separate from the bases, or with rings as part of the bases. Bases come in various variantes to fit either Sako tapered dovetail rail (available for three different types of action lengths), Tikka straight dovetail (11 mm or 17 mm), Weaver or Picatinny.
 Sako tapered dovetail rail (used on SAKO models Sako 75, Sako 85, L461, L579, S491, M591, L61R, L691, M995 and TRG-S)
 Sauer ISI mount (Sauer 303, and a very few editions of Sauer 202)
 Sauer SUM mount (Sauer 404)
 Schultz & Larsen integral Slide & Lock type
 "STANAG" Claw Mount, used on FN FAL, HK G3, HK33, G3SG/1 and MP5. Most STANAG bases must be used with corresponding STANAG rings, but there are also STANAG bases for scopes with rails.
 Dovetail rail (for example 11 mm, 17 mm or 19 mm). The flank angle varies, and dovetail rail mounts may therefore be regarded as non-standardized, even for a given witdth.
 Trijicon ACOG/VCOG rail

Screw pattern on bases 
On receivers without an integrated attachment for mounting a scope (for example an integrated Picatinny rail), the base is usually screwed on as a separate part. Such mounts are often model-specific to the firearm, and depend on factors such as the radius of the receiver bridge, the type of screw and the distance between the screw holes. A common fastening method is by screws. These are often metric M3.5x0.6 mm or US #6-48 (⌀ 3.5 mm, 0.53 mm pitch) or #8-40 (⌀ 4.2 mm, 0.64 mm pitch). Many European assemblies use M3.5 screws, such as Sako Optilock, Recknagel and original CZ rings. Since #6-48 and M3.5x0.6 have near identical diameters and almost equal pitch, there is a potential for confusion, and upon mixing the wrong screw will enter the threads, but will gradually become tighter to screw until the thread is destroyed. In case of damage, the hole must often be drilled and re-threaded, and M4x0.7 or #8-40 may then be relevant alternatives.

Remington 700 pattern
The Remington 700 Short Action (SA) scope base attachment pattern is particularly widespread, and is for example used on models such as:

 Remington Model 722, 40x, 78, 740, 742, 760, 710, 721, 722 and 725
 Mauser M1996 straight pull and Roesser Titan 16
 Mauser SR-97
 Sauer 100, Sauer 101, Mauser M18 (not the M12)
 Bergara B14 LA
 Haenel Jäger 10
 Sabatti Rover LA

The Remington 700 Long Action (LA) naturally has a longer distance between the front and rear screw holes, and therefore continuous scope mount assemblies for the 700 LA do not fit on the 700 SA nor the above-mentioned firearms. However, two-piece scope mounts in general interchange for the mentioned models.

List of common screw patterns
Bases with a rounded bottom for mounting on a round receiver bridges should ideally have a slightly smaller radius than the receiver in order to provide two points of contact and give a stable attachment. Conversely, a slightly too large radius on the mount will result in just one point of contact and a less stable attachment.

In the table below, the radius refers to the curvature of the mounting surface on the receiver bridge. The base is often attached with two screws on the front receiver bridge and two screws on the rear receiver bridge, but sometimes with several more screws. The hole distances are measured from center-to-center. Some common hole distances are 12.7 mm, 15.37 mm and 21.84 mm (0.500", 0.605" and 0.860", respectively). The two front screws are referred to in the list below as screws 1 and 2, and the front hole spacing is thus referred to as «distance 1-2». In the same way, the rear hole distance is called «distance 3-4». The distance between these is largely determined by the receiver length, and is stated here as «distance 2-3»

Other features

Quick release 

Quick release (QR) can refer to several different variants of scope mounts which can be mounted and disassembled quickly without tools.

Tilt 

In some cases, it may be relevant to add extra inclination to the scope to be able to shoot at longer (or shorter) distance. For example, this is popular for long range shooting, where it is common to use a tilt of 6 mrad (20 MOA). Extra tilt can be achieved several ways, like for example with a tilted Picatiny rail (e.g. 6 mrad tilt), with bases or rings (e.g. 6 mrad tilt) or with special insert rings (e.g. Burris Pos-Align).

Scope height 
The height of scope sight can be important for the cheek rest support (often called cheek weld) in order to gain correct eye placement, as well as for calculating ballistics (e.g. a ballistic table). The latter is particularly relevant at very close ranges (e.g. 15 meters [50 ft]), while at longer distances, such as in long range shooting, the scope height has less impact on the ballistic calculations.

The height of a scope sight can be measured in many ways. With regard to ballistic calculations, it is generally only measured from the center of the bore axis to the center of the scope sight (sightline). With regard to cheek support, several methods are used: On firearms with a picatinny rail, the height is measured from the top of the picatinny rail on the firearm. On most other types of bases it is common to measure from the top radius of the receiver bridge. When the bottom measuring point is determined, the height is then measured up to either the optical center or the bottom of the scope tube (on scopes for ring mounts). The difference between these two measuring methods is distance from the optical center to the bottom of the scope tube, and usually corresponds to half of the tube diameter (e.g. 15 mm on binoculars with a 30 mm tube).

See also 
 M-LOK
 Bipod

References 

Mechanical standards
Firearm components